The Loterie de Bébés was an alleged raffle in Paris, France, in 1911 where the prizes were orphaned human babies. This was done with approval from the authorities in Paris in order to find homes for the children and raise money for an orphanage and several charities.

From 1804 until 1923, only adults could be adopted in France, and only in very specific circumstances. In January 1912, Popular Mechanics noted that "an investigation of the winners was made, of course, to determine their desirability as foster parents".

References 

1911 in France
Adoption in France
Family law